The Stinson Voyager was a 1940s American light utility monoplane built by the Stinson Aircraft Company.

Development
First developed as the Stinson HW-75 and marketed as the Model 105 in 1939, the design was a high-wing three-seat braced monoplane powered by either a 75-hp (63.4-Kw) Continental A-75 or an 80-hp (67.7-Kw) Continental A-80-6. This was developed into the Model 10 powered by a Continental A-80 piston engine. The Model 10 introduced a wider cabin as well as an improved standard for the interior and finish. The Model 10 was followed by the Model 10A, powered by a Franklin 4AC-199 engine and the Model 10B with a Lycoming GO-145. The 10A was the last of the series, but the first to be called "Voyager", a name that was retained for the post-war Stinson 108.  

Six Model 10s were evaluated by the United States Army Air Forces (USAAF) as the YO-54. The unsuccessful tests led Stinson to design an all-new aircraft designated Model 76, later known as the L-5 Sentinel.

A number of Model 105s and Model 10As were impressed into USAAF service as the AT-19 (later L-9).

After World War II, the type was developed as the Model 108, the prototypes being converted Model 10As.

Variants

HW-75 (marketed as Model 105)
Production variant also known as the HW-75 with a Continental A-75 engine), or HW-80 with a Continental A-80 engine, 277 built.
Model 10
Improved production variant with an 80 hp Continental A-80 engine, 260 built.
Model 10A Voyager
Variant with a 90 hp Franklin 4AC-199 engine, 515 built (10A and 10B).The first of the series to bear the Voyager name. 
Model 10B
Variant with a 75 hp Lycoming GO-145 engine, 515 built (10A and 10B).
YO-54
United States Army designation for six Model 10s for evaluation.
AT-19A
Original military designation for eight Model 105s impressed in 1942, later changed to L-9A.
AT-19B
Original designation for 12 impressed Model 10A Voyagers, later changed to L-9B.
L-9A
Final designation for eight impressed Model 105 Voyagers, originally AT-19A.
L-9B
Final designation for 12 impressed Model 10A Voyagers, originally AT-19B.

Operators

Brazilian Air Force - Model 105

Royal Canadian Air Force

United States Army Air Forces

Specifications (Model 105)

See also

Notes

Bibliography
 Andrade, John. U.S.Military Aircraft Designations and Serials since 1909. Leicester, UK: Midland Counties Publications, 1979. .
 The Illustrated Encyclopedia of Aircraft (Part Work 1982-1985). London: Orbis Publishing, 1985.

 Simpson, R.W. Airlife's General Aviation. Shrewsbory, Shrops, UK: Airlife Publishing, 1991. .
 Wegg, John. General Dynamic Aircraft and their Predecessors''. London: Putnam, 1990. .

External links

1930s United States civil utility aircraft
Voyager
Single-engined tractor aircraft
High-wing aircraft
Aircraft first flown in 1939